Wayne Elliot Knight  (born August 7, 1955) is an American actor. In television, he played Newman on Seinfeld (1992–1998) and Officer Don Orville on 3rd Rock from the Sun (1996–2001). He also voiced Igor on Toonsylvania (1998–1999), Mr. Blik on Catscratch (2005–2007) and Baron Von Sheldgoose on Legend of the Three Caballeros (2018).

In film, he played Dennis Nedry in Jurassic Park (1993), which earned him a Saturn Award for Best Supporting Actor nomination. He also portrayed Pete "Piccolo" Dugan in Dead Again (1991), John Correli in Basic Instinct (1992), Stan Podolak in Space Jam (1996) and Zach Mallozzi in Rat Race (2001) and provided the voices of Tantor in Tarzan (1999), Al McWhiggin in Toy Story 2 (1999) and The Elf Elder in Tom and Jerry: The Lost Dragon (2014).

Early life
Wayne Elliot Knight was born on August 7, 1955, in New York City to a Catholic family.  They moved to Cartersville, Georgia, where his father worked in the textile industry. Knight went to local schools and was a lineman on his high school's football team. He attended the University of Georgia but did not complete his degree until 2008.

Although an honours student, Knight left college just one credit shy of completing his degree to pursue his acting career. He received an internship at the Barter Theatre in Abingdon, Virginia, which produced repertory works. After completing his internship, he joined the company and gained standing as an Equity actor. He subsequently moved to New York City and after two years landed his first role on Broadway.

After his time on Broadway, he also worked as a private investigator for five years.

Career
Knight appeared in various films produced at the end of the 1980s, and beginning of the 1990s, including Dirty Dancing (1987), Born on the Fourth of July (1989), JFK (1991) and Basic Instinct (1992). He was the first actor cast in Jurassic Park after director Steven Spielberg saw his performance in Basic Instinct. Knight was cast as InGen Corporation's chief programmer for the park and secret spy for Biosyn, Dennis Nedry.

He also appeared in Dead Again, To Die For, and Space Jam. In the 1990s, Knight played supporting roles on two television series on NBC. He played the mailman Newman, Jerry's neighbour and nemesis in Seinfeld, and Officer Don Orville, Sally's love interest, in 3rd Rock from the Sun. He had earlier appeared in Against the Grain. He also appeared as a regular on two sketch comedy series, The Edge for Fox and Assaulted Nuts for Cinemax and Channel 4 in the United Kingdom.

Knight also appeared on Broadway in the plays Gemini, Mastergate, 'Art' and Sweet Charity with Christina Applegate.

Knight has done voice work for numerous animations, including the black cat Mr. Blik on the Nickelodeon cartoon Catscratch, Igor on the Fox Kids cartoon Toonsylvania, the dragon Dojo Kanojo Cho in the Kids' WB! animated series Xiaolin Showdown, Evil Emperor Zurg on Buzz Lightyear of Star Command on Toon Disney and Disney Channel; Al McWhiggin, the toy store manager of Al's Toy Barn, in Toy Story 2; Tantor the elephant in Tarzan, Demetrius the shopkeeper in Hercules, and the bug Juju on Tak and the Power of Juju. He made guest appearances on Billy & Mandy's Jacked-Up Halloween as Jack O'Lantern, Dilbert as the Security Guard, and Brandy and Mr. Whiskers as Mr. Cantarious the snail.

Knight appeared on the pilot episode of the American version of Thank God You're Here. He made a second appearance, on the last episode of the first season of the television series. He won the Thank God You're Here blue door award. He played the Punisher's techno sidekick Microchip in Punisher: War Zone. Knight guest starred in The Penguins of Madagascar as Max the Cat, in the episodes "Launchtime" and "Cat's Cradle".

In November 2009, Knight reprised his role as the Seinfeld character Newman, for the seventh season of Curb Your Enthusiasm. He also guest starred on CSI: Crime Scene Investigation Season 10, Episode "Working Stiffs".

Knight guest starred on a 2010 episode of Fox's drama series Bones, in the first season of the TV Land comedy series Hot in Cleveland (2010), where he became a recurring character for season two, and on an episode of The Whole Truth in the fall of 2010. He played an Internet fixated couch potato in the TV Land sitcom, The Exes. In the summer of 2011, he appeared in the BBC/Starz series Torchwood: Miracle Day as Brian Friedkin.

Knight appeared as Santa in Elf: The Musical in November 2012. He previously appeared on Broadway in Art in 1999. In April 2012, Knight was featured in the romantic comedy, She Wants Me. In February 2014, Knight reprised the character Newman, during one commercial during the Super Bowl, alongside Jerry Seinfeld and Jason Alexander. In December 2017, Knight was featured in an advertisement for KFC depicting Colonel Sanders.

Personal life
Knight married makeup artist Paula Sutor on May 26, 1996, in a ceremony held in fellow Seinfeld cast member Michael Richards's home. They had divorced by December 2003. He married his second wife Clare de Chenu on October 15, 2006; together they have a son, Liam. The family lives in Toluca Lake, Los Angeles, an area where Knight has resided for many years.

Knight was in attendance at the 2012 Democratic National Convention. Ahead of the 2020 United States presidential election, Knight appeared in an advertisement that examined "ethical breaches" of mail workers in the US and lack of support they received from the government. The advertisement was in support of the Democratic Party and Anti-Trump.

Filmography

Film

Television

Video games

Theatre

Awards and nominations

References

External links

 
 
 
 

1955 births
Living people
20th-century American male actors
21st-century American male actors
American male film actors
American male television actors
American male voice actors
California Democrats
Male actors from Georgia (U.S. state)
Male actors from New York City
People from Cartersville, Georgia
University of Georgia alumni